Baeza is a small town in — and canton seat of — Quijos Canton in Napo Province, Ecuador. It is the home of the Quijos-Quichua indigenous people. It is located near the Quijos river on South America.

Climate
Baeza has a subtropical highland climate (Cfb) with mild weather year-round and heavy rainfall.

References

External links

 Map of the Napo Province
 www.inec.gov.ec
 www.ame.gov.ec

Populated places in Napo Province